Héctor Yuste Cantón (born 12 January 1988) is a Spanish professional footballer who plays for Cypriot club AC Omonia as a central defender or a defensive midfielder.

Club career
Born in Cartagena, Yuste started out at local clubs Fuente Álamo and Real Murcia, finishing his youth career at neighbours FC Cartagena. In 2006, he made his first appearances for the latter's main squad, in Segunda División B.

Yuste returned to Cartagena after one year at loan at amateurs AD Las Palas, helping them return to Segunda División in 2008–09 and finishing the season in the starting XI after a coaching move. The following campaign, as the Region of Murcia side nearly promoted again, he contributed 18 games.

From 2010–11 to 2013–14, Yuste was relegated three times from the second division, successively with UD Salamanca, Racing de Santander and Hércules CF. For the 2014–15 season he returned to Granada CF who had loaned him to the latter two teams, making his La Liga debut on 23 August 2014 by playing the first half of a 2–1 home win against Deportivo de La Coruña (0–1 at half-time).

Yuste returned to the second tier late into the 2015 January transfer window, being loaned to RCD Mallorca; in the summer, the move was made permanent. He scored his first goal for the Balearic Islands club on 27 March 2016, helping to a 1–1 draw at UD Almería.

Following Mallorca's relegation in 2017, Yuste signed with Apollon Limassol FC in the Cypriot First Division, where he shared teams with compatriot Adrián Sardinero.

Honours
 Omonia
Cypriot Cup: 2021–22
Cypriot Super Cup: 2021

References

External links

1988 births
Living people
Sportspeople from Cartagena, Spain
Spanish footballers
Footballers from the Region of Murcia
Association football defenders
Association football midfielders
La Liga players
Segunda División players
Segunda División B players
Tercera División players
FC Cartagena footballers
UD Salamanca players
Granada CF footballers
Cádiz CF players
Racing de Santander players
Hércules CF players
RCD Mallorca players
Cypriot First Division players
Apollon Limassol FC players
AC Omonia players
Spanish expatriate footballers
Expatriate footballers in Cyprus
Spanish expatriate sportspeople in Cyprus